Revenge is committing a harmful action against a person or group in response to a grievance, be it real or perceived. Primitive justice or retributive justice is often differentiated from more formal and refined forms of justice such as distributive justice and divine judgment.

Function in society

Social psychologist Ian Mckee states that the desire for the sustenance of power motivates vengeful behavior as a means of impression management: "People who are more vengeful tend to be those who are motivated by power, by authority and by the desire for status. They don't want to lose face".

Vengeful behavior has been found across a majority of human societies. Some societies encourage vengeful behavior, which is called a feud. These societies usually regard the honor of individuals and groups as of central importance. Thus, while protecting of their reputation an avenger feels as if they restore the previous state of dignity and justice. According to Michael Ignatieff, "Revenge is a profound moral desire to keep faith with the dead, to honor their memory by taking up their cause where they left off". Thus, honor may become a heritage that passes from generation to generation. Whenever it is compromised, the affected family or community members might feel compelled to retaliate against an offender to restore the initial "balance of honor" that preceded the perceived injury. This cycle of honor might expand by bringing the family members and then the entire community of the new victim into the brand-new cycle of revenge that may pervade generations.

History 

Francis Bacon described revenge as a kind of "wild justice" that "does [..]. offend the law [and] putteth the law out of office." 

Feuds are cycles of provocation and retaliation, fueled by a desire for revenge and carried out over long periods of time by familial or tribal groups. They were an important part of many pre-industrial societies, especially in the Mediterranean region. They still persist in some areas, notably in Albania with its tradition of gjakmarrja or "blood feuds".

Blood feuds are still practised in many parts of the world, including Kurdish regions of Turkey and in Papua New Guinea.

In Japan, honouring one's family, clan, or lord through the practice of revenge killings is called "katakiuchi" (敵討ち). These killings could also involve the relatives of an offender. Today, katakiuchi is most often pursued by peaceful means, but revenge remains an important part of Japanese culture.

Social psychology

Philosophers tend to believe that to punish and to take revenge are vastly different activities: "One who undertakes to punish rationally does not do so for the sake of the wrongdoing, which is now in the past - but for the sake of the future, that the wrongdoing shall not be repeated, either by him, or by others who see him, or by others who see him punished". Whereas, to seek revenge is motivated by a yearning to see a transgressor suffer; revenge is necessarily preceded by anger, whereas punishment doesn't have to be.

Indeed, Kaiser, Vick, & Major point out the following: "An important psychological implication of the various efforts to define revenge is that
there is no objective standard for declaring an act to be motivated by revenge or not.
Revenge is a label that is ascribed based on perceivers’ attributions for the act. Revenge
is an inference, regardless of whether the individuals making the inference are the harmdoers themselves, the injured parties, or outsiders. Because revenge is an inference, various individuals can disagree on whether the same action is revenge or not."

Belief in a just-world hypothesis is also associated with revenge: in particular, having strong experiences or challenges against beliefs in a just-world, can increase distress and motivate individuals to seek revenge, as a means of justice restoration.

A growing body of research reveals that a vengeful disposition is related to adverse health outcomes: strong desires for revenge and greater willingness to act on these desires have been associated with post-traumatic stress disorder symptoms and psychiatric morbidity.

Proverbs
The popular expression "revenge is a dish best served cold" suggests that revenge is more satisfying if enacted when unexpected or long feared, inverting traditional civilized revulsion toward "cold-blooded" violence.

The idea's origin is obscure. The French diplomat Charles Maurice de Talleyrand-Périgord (1754–1838) has been credited with the saying, "La vengeance est un met que l'on doit manger froid" ["Revenge is a dish that must be eaten cold"], albeit without supporting detail. It has been in the English language at least since the 1846 translation of the 1845 French novel Mathilde by Joseph Marie Eugène Sue: "la vengeance se mange très bien froide", there italicized as if quoting a proverbial saying, and translated "revenge is very good eaten cold". It has been wrongly credited to the novel Les Liaisons Dangereuses (1782).

The phrase has also been credited to the Pashtuns of Afghanistan.

A Japanese proverb states, "If you want revenge, then dig two graves".  This reference is frequently misunderstood by Western audiences however, the Japanese reader understands this proverb to mean that the attacker is so dedicated to killing their enemy, that living is less important than the killing of their enemy.

In art 

Revenge is a popular subject across many forms of art. Some examples include the painting Herodias' Revenge by Juan de Flandes and the operas Don Giovanni and The Marriage of Figaro, both by Wolfgang Amadeus Mozart.  In Japanese art, revenge is a theme in various woodblock prints depicting the forty-seven rōnin by many well-known and influential artists, including Utagawa Kuniyoshi. The Chinese playwright Ji Junxiang used revenge as the central theme in his theatrical work The Orphan of Zhao; it depicts more specifically familial revenge, which is placed in the context of Confucian morality and social hierarchical structure.

In literature 

Revenge has been a popular literary theme historically and continues to play a role in contemporary works. Examples of literature that feature revenge as a theme include the plays Hamlet and Othello by William Shakespeare, the novel The Count of Monte Cristo by Alexandre Dumas, and the short story "The Cask of Amontillado" by Edgar Allan Poe. More modern examples include the novels Carrie by Stephen King, Gone Girl by Gillian Flynn, and The Princess Bride by William Goldman. Although revenge is a theme in itself, it is also considered to be a genre.

Revenge as a genre has been consistent with a variety of themes that have frequently appeared in different texts over the last few centuries. Such themes include but are not limited to: disguise, masking, sex, cannibalism, the grotesque, bodily fluids, power, violent murders, and secrecy. Each theme is usually coupled with the concept of dramatic irony. Dramatic irony is a literary device in which the audience possesses knowledge unavailable to characters in a novel, play, or film. Its purpose is to intensify the tragic events that are going to unfold by creating tension between the audience and the actions of the characters.

The most common theme within the genre of revenge is the recurring violent murders that take place throughout the text, especially in the final act or scene. The root of the violence is usually derived from the characters' childhood development.

The themes of masking and disguise have the ability to go hand in hand with one another. A character may employ disguise literally or metaphorically. A mask is the literal example of this theme; while pretending to be something one is not is considered to be the metaphoric example. Additional themes that may cause the protagonist and antagonist to develop a masked or disguised identity include sex, power, and even cannibalism. Examples of sex and power being used as themes can be seen in the novel Gone Girl by Gillian Flynn, as well as the already mentioned drama, Titus Andronicus.

On the Internet 
The emergence of the Internet has provided new ways of exacting revenge. Customer revenge targets businesses and corporations with the intent to cause damage or harm. In general, people tend to place more credence in online reviews rather than corporate communications. With technology becoming more readily available, corporations and firms are more likely to experience damage caused by negative reviews posted online going viral. Recent studies indicate this type of consumer rage is becoming more common, especially in Western societies.

The rise of social media sites like Facebook, Twitter, and YouTube act as public platforms for exacting new forms of revenge. Revenge porn involves the public dissemination of intimate pictures and videos of another person's sexual activity out of motives for revenge with the intent of creating widespread shame. Participation in online revenge porn activities incites a sense of pleasure through the harm being caused. The allowance of anonymity on revenge porn sites encourages further incivility by empowering and encouraging this type of behavior. In many instances, the original poster provides the victim's personal information, including links to social media accounts. Online revenge porn's origins can be traced to 2010 when Hunter Moore created the first site, IsAnyoneUp, to share photos of his nude girlfriend.

In animals 

Humans are not the only species known to take revenge. There are several species such as camels, elephants, fish, lions, coots, crows, and many species of primates (chimpanzees, macaques, baboons, etc.) that have been recognized to seek revenge. Primatologists Frans de Waal and Lesleigh Luttrellave conducted numerous studies that provide evidence of revenge in many species of primates. They observed chimpanzees and noticed patterns of revenge. For example, if chimpanzee A helped chimpanzee B defeat his opponent, chimpanzee C, then chimpanzee C would be more likely to help chimpanzee A's opponent in a later squabble. Chimpanzees are one of the most common species that show revenge due to their desire for dominance. Studies have also been performed on less cognitive species such as fish to demonstrate that not only intellectual animals execute revenge.

See also 

Crime of passion
Cycle of violence
Dirty Work (1998 film)
Divine retribution
Eye for an eye
Frontier justice
Guilt-Shame-Fear spectrum of cultures
Honor killing
Just-world hypothesis
Karma
Lawsuit
Nemesis (mythology)
Proportionality (law)
Punishment
Reprisal
Retributive justice
Revenge dress
Schadenfreude
Two wrongs make a right
Vengeful ghost
Vigilantism
War

References

Further reading 
 Rachel Stein. 2019. Vengeful Citizens, Violent States: A Theory of War and Revenge. Cambridge University Press.

External links

 
Punishment